Pejeperro Wildlife Refuge, is a protected area in Costa Rica, managed under the Osa Conservation Area, it was created in 2000 by decree 28550-MINAE.

References 

Nature reserves in Costa Rica
Protected areas established in 2000